Marjorie L. Byrnes is an American politician and attorney from the state of New York. A Republican, Byrnes has represented the 133rd district of the New York State Assembly, covering Livingston County and other areas to the south of Rochester, since 2019.

Career
Byrnes worked as an attorney for 32 years. In that time, she served variously as a judge with the Rochester City Court, as an assistant district attorney for Monroe County, and most recently as court attorney to Livingston County Court Judge Dennis Cohen.

After her retirement from the court system in 2017, Byrnes became a Caledonia Village Trustee.

Electoral history
In 2018, Byrnes announced that she would launch a primary challenge to Republican incumbent Joseph Errigo, who had been selected by Republican leadership for the 133rd district in 2016 following Bill Nojay's suicide. Byrnes easily defeated Errigo, with 61% of the vote to his 39%.

That November, Byrnes defeated Democrat Barbara Baer with 55% of the vote. She took office on January 9, 2019.

Personal life
Byrnes has lived in Caledonia for 12 years.

References

Living people
People from Caledonia, New York
New York (state) lawyers
New York (state) state court judges
Town supervisors in New York (state)
Republican Party members of the New York State Assembly
21st-century American politicians
Women state legislators in New York (state)
21st-century American women politicians
1960 births